Gustaf Evert Mickels (9 November 1879, Ruotsinpyhtää - 24 July 1949) was a Finnish politician. He was a member of the Parliament of Finland from 1922 to 1924, representing the Swedish People's Party of Finland (SFP).

References

1879 births
1949 deaths
People from Ruotsinpyhtää
People from Uusimaa Province (Grand Duchy of Finland)
Swedish-speaking Finns
Swedish People's Party of Finland politicians
Members of the Parliament of Finland (1922–24)